Paula Iversen (born 17 February 1970) is a former female tennis player from Zimbabwe.

Iversen has a career high WTA doubles ranking of 217 achieved on 31 January 1994. Iversen has won 3 ITF doubles titles.

Iversen made her WTA main draw debut at the 1994 Japan Open Tennis Championships in the doubles event partnering Hiromi Nagano.

Playing for Zimbabwe at the Fed Cup, Iversen has accumulated a win–loss record of 11–17. Iversen retirement from professional tennis in 1997.

ITF finals (3–1)

Doubles (3–1)

References

External links 

 
 

1970 births
Living people
Zimbabwean female tennis players
Sportspeople from Harare
White Zimbabwean sportspeople
African Games medalists in tennis
African Games gold medalists for Zimbabwe
African Games bronze medalists for Zimbabwe
Competitors at the 1991 All-Africa Games
Competitors at the 1995 All-Africa Games